Catherine Byron (born 22 August 1947) is an Irish poet who often collaborates with visual and sound artists.

Biography
Catherine Greenfield was born in London to a mother from Galway and was raised in Belfast. She has lived in Oxford, Scotland, Derry and County Donegal. She became Catherine Byron when she married at about twenty and had daughters. Educated in Somerville College, Oxford, Byron studied Classics and wrote poetry for most of her life until she married. She stopped writing then for about ten years. Since resuming poetry Byron has published six collections. As well as writing her own poetry, Byron has studied Seamus Heaney and wrote the work Out of Step: Pursuing Seamus Heaney to Purgatory.

Byron frequently works both with artist and calligrapher Denis Brown, and painter and printmaker Eileen Coxon. She has been artist in residence at the Hayward Gallery and the department of Glass & Ceramics at the University of Sunderland. She has taught writing and Medieval Literature at Nottingham Trent University.

Bibliography
The Getting of Vellum (Salmon 2001)
The Fat-Hen Field Hospital (Bristol 1993)
Settlements and Samhain (Bristol 1993)
Out of Step: Pursuing Seamus Heaney to Purgatory (prose) (Bristol 1992)

References and sources

1947 births
Living people
People from London
Irish women poets
20th-century Irish poets
20th-century Irish women writers
21st-century Irish poets
21st-century Irish women writers
Alumni of Somerville College, Oxford